The 1925 Waldeck state election was held on 17 May 1925 to elect the 17 Landesvertreter (State Representatives) of the Free State of Waldeck. This was the last election conducted in Waldeck before the state merged with the Free State of Prussia on 1 May 1929.

Results

References 

1925 elections in Germany
1925